Záborské is a village and municipality in Prešov District in the Prešov Region of eastern Slovakia.

History
The first written mention of the village dates back to 1303. The original name Haršag was derived from the Hungarian Harsagh-i. linden branch. The municipality had the property in the extent of 12 settlements, each of which consisted of 4 families with an area of about 30 ha of land.

In 1424, after the landowner Peteja became the owner of the village with mansion, land and other property landowner Farkaš, who owned this property until 1787 (that is 360 years). Farkaš family in the village was replaced by the Zaturecky family, who owned the village and its property until the beginning of the 20th century, probably until 1908. Under the Zatureckých family was in the village 1841 built by Roman Church dedicated to the Assumption of the Virgin Mary. It was built on the original cemetery. Family of Zaturecki had a chapel built to honor St. Cross - in the castle mansion and at the entrance to the new cemetery a chapel to honor St. John Nepomuk.

After the Zaturecki family, the land estate was divided so that a manor house with a garden was bought by a lawyer from Prešov - Dr. Kakusz Bela and land in the extravaganza were bought by harshack peasants and jellies. Dr. Kakusz sold the mansion with garden and farm building in 1919 local citizen Juraj Žula.

The village has its current name since 1948. We are a suburban village of Prešov. The center of the village has an altitude of 319 m. The Záborský brook flows through its center and flows into the Torysa River. The village has a very convenient location to the city of Presov, which makes it easier for citizens to access jobs, culture, sports and education.

Name of the village in individual years:
 1303 – Hasag
 1773 – Harsagh
 1786 – Harschagy
 1920 – Haršak
 1927 – Haršag
 since 1948 – Záborské.

Geography
The municipality lies at an altitude of 319 metres and covers an area of  (2020-06-30/-07-01).

Population 
It has a population of 1,073 people (2020-12-31).

References 

Villages and municipalities in Prešov District
Šariš